The Karma Revero is a luxury plug-in hybrid sports sedan manufactured in the United States by Chinese-owned Karma Automotive. It is a revamped version of the Fisker Karma car. The first of the new production, for model year 2017, was released in September 2016.

Background

The Revero predecessor was first introduced by Fisker Automotive as the Karma in 2012. It was the only model produced by Fisker before it went out of business in 2013. The tooling for the Fisker Karma was bought by Wanxiang in 2014. The tooling was moved from the factory in Finland to a new factory in Moreno Valley, California, USA. A total of 2,667 Fisker Karma were built before production was stopped. Karma's current headquarters reside in Irvine, California.

History

The Fisker Karma was redesigned by Karma Automotive and reintroduced as the Karma Revero. The 2017 Revero was launched on September 8, 2016, at Laguna Beach. The exterior of the Karma Revero closely resembles the Fisker Karma, keeping the design produced by Henrik Fisker. The Karma Revero car also won 2018's Green Luxury Car of the Year award from Green Car Journal.

In 2018, Karma announced a limited production high-end package, the Karma Revero Aliso, named after the California beach, that adds $15,000 to the price of the car, resulting with a $145,000 starting price car, with a limited run of 15 units.

In 2019, an updated version, the Karma Revero GT, was revealed, using a three-cylinder 1.5 liter BMW engine as a range extender instead of the older model's drive motor GM engine. The new engine configuration launched in 2020, and it used to use the same B38 engine found in the BMW i8. Included in the changes is a larger battery.

Karma GS-6

In 2021, the Karma GS-6 was introduced. It is basically a refreshed and cheaper version of the Karma Revero plug-in hybrid (or a range-extended vehicle), with its base price in the US$80 to 90k range. The battery capacity remains at 28 kWh. According to the manufacturer, the all-electric range is "up to" , after which the vehicle smoothly switches to gasoline power.

An all-electric version, the GSe-6, was also announced.

Specifications
2017 model
 US$130,000 base vehicle list price
  four-cylinder turbocharged internal combustion engine
  total power delivered at rear-wheel drive
  all-electric range
  total range
 Solar photovoltaic panelled roof
  lithium-ion battery
 10-hour charge-time @ 16 amps and 120 volts (North American home socket)
 24 minutes to 80% charge at quickcharge
 5.4-second  acceleration time 
  top speed
 10.7" Touchscreen Infotainment car control center 
 Digital dashboard
 Apple CarPlay
 Android Auto

2020 GT model
 US$135,000 base vehicle list price
 Three-cylinder BMW TwinPower turbocharged generator
  total power from two electric motors on the rear axle
  lithium-ion battery
 4.5-second  acceleration time
  top speed

See also
 Karma Automotive

References

External links

 

Full-size vehicles
Luxury vehicles
Sports sedans
Plug-in hybrid vehicles
Hybrid electric cars
Cars introduced in 2016
Henrik Fisker